Chuck Hulse (October 3, 1927 – July 13, 2020) was an American racecar driver.

Hulse raced in the USAC Championship Car series in the 1959-1964 and 1966-1968 seasons, with 60 career starts, including the Indianapolis 500 races in 1962, 1963, 1966 and 1967. He finished in the top ten 26 times, with his best finish in 2nd position in 1963 at Phoenix and 1966 at Sacramento. Hulse stopped driving for 2 years in 1964-1966 due to vision problems caused in a sprint car accident in New Bremen, Ohio.

Hulse died on July 13, 2020, aged 92 years.

Indianapolis 500 results

References

External links
Driver Database Profile

1927 births
2020 deaths
Indianapolis 500 drivers
Sportspeople from Anaheim, California
Racing drivers from California